Schloss Salzdahlum was a former summer palace built by Anthony Ulrich, Duke of Brunswick-Wolfenbüttel in 1684.
It was dismantled in 1813 but parts of it can still be seen in the town of Salzdahlum.

Located between Braunschweig and Wolfenbüttel, the palace was the location where Frederick II of Prussia married Elisabeth Christine of Brunswick-Wolfenbüttel, Queen of Prussia in 1733. The large art collection that used to be kept there is largely intact and can be viewed locally at the Herzog Anton Ulrich Museum.

Buildings and structures in Wolfenbüttel
Principality of Brunswick-Wolfenbüttel
Culture of Lower Saxony
Buildings and structures completed in 1684
Buildings and structures demolished in 1813
1684 establishments in the Holy Roman Empire
Demolished buildings and structures in Germany